Edvard Rodhe was the name of two Swedish theologians and churchmen:

Edvard Herman Rodhe (1845–1932), Bishop of Gothenburg 1888–1929 on List of members of the upper house of the Riksdag
Edvard Magnus Rodhe (1878–1954), Bishop of Lund 1925–1948, son of the above